If My Heart Had Windows is the second studio album by American country music artist Patty Loveless, and was released in 1988. The title track — a cover of a George Jones song from 1967 — became Loveless' first top ten hit, peaking on the Billboard Country Music charts at number 10. It was then followed by her biggest chart position (number 2 on September 10, 1988) at the time with "A Little Bit In Love," a song written by country artist Steve Earle.  It also features a recording of the song "Baby's Gone Blues", which would be recorded by Shelby Lynne for her 1990 album Tough All Over and by Reba McEntire for her 1992 album It's Your Call.

The album peaked at number 33 on April 2, 1988.

This album was released the same year (1988) that Loveless became a Member of the Grand Ole Opry.

Track listing

Personnel
Patty Loveless - lead vocals
Anthony Crawford, Vince Gill, Mary Ann Kennedy, Patty Loveless, Claire Lynch, Mac McAnally, Donna MacElroy, Michael Mishaw, Joann Neal, Pam Rose, Karen Staley - background vocals
Reggie Young, Billy Joe Walker, Jr. - guitars
Paul Franklin - dobro & steel guitar
John Barlow Jarvis, Matt Rollings - piano
Mike Lawler - keyboards, synthesizers, synthetic percussion
Emory Gordy Jr. - bass guitar
Glen Duncan - fiddle
Eddie Bayers - drums

Production
Produced by Tony Brown & Emory Gordy Jr.
Recording Engineers: Steve Tillisch & Ron Treat; assisted by Mark  J. Coddington, Tim Kish, Russ Martin & Keith Odle
Overdubs Recorded by Ron Treat
Mixed by Steve Tillisch
Digital Editing: Milan Bogdan
Mastered by Glenn Meadows

Chart performance

Singles
 Loveless stated that she dedicated "You Saved Me" to her producer at the time, and later husband, Emory Gordy, Jr. The song charted for 7 weeks on the Billboard Hot Country Singles and Tracks chart, reaching number 43 during the week of 12 December 1987.

References

1988 albums
Patty Loveless albums
MCA Records albums
Albums produced by Tony Brown (record producer)
Albums produced by Emory Gordy Jr.